Christian Moses (born 10 August 1993) is a Sierra Leonean footballer who plays as a forward for IFK Värnamo.

Club career
Born in Freetown, Moses played for Juventus IF, Kallon and FC Lion Pride before joining Vendsyssel FF on loan from the latter on 31 January 2017, in a loan deal lasting until 30 June 2017, and rejoined the club on loan until the end of 2017. 

In January 2018, Moses signed for Danish 1st Division side Viborg FF on loan from FC Lion Pride. He joined the club on a permanent basis in August 2018, signing a two-and-a-half year deal with the club. In January 2020, Moses joined Icelandic club Knattspyrnufélagið Víkingur on a trial period. In August 2020 Viborg confirmed that Moses had left the club to join an unnamed Swedish club, with him signing a one-and-a-half year contract with FC Linköping City in September 2020.

In July 2021, Moses signed for Superettan club IFK Värnamo. He scored 5 goals in 15 games as Värnamo won the 2021 Superettan.

International career
He made his debut for Sierra Leone on 6 September 2015 in a 0–0 draw with Ivory Coast.

Career statistics

Club

International

Honours
Vendsyssel FF
Danish 1st Division runner-up: 2016–17

Viborg FF
Danish 1st Division runner-up: 2018–19, 2019–20

IFK Värnamo
Superettan: 2021

Source:

References

External links
 
 

Living people
1993 births
Sportspeople from Freetown
Sierra Leonean footballers
Sierra Leone international footballers
Association football forwards
Juventus IF players
Vendsyssel FF players
Viborg FF players
FC Linköping City players
IFK Värnamo players
Danish 1st Division players
Sierra Leonean expatriate footballers
Superettan players
Ettan Fotboll players
Expatriate footballers in Sweden
Expatriate men's footballers in Denmark
Sierra Leonean expatriate sportspeople in Sweden
Sierra Leonean expatriate sportspeople in Denmark